LOF may refer to:

In acronyms and codes:
 Lack-of-fit test (disambiguation), a concept in statistics
 Libbey–Owens–Ford, an automotive and building glass manufacturer
 Lloyd's Open Form: a type of salvage agreement offered by Lloyd's of London
 Local Outlier Factor, an anomaly detection algorithm
 Lok Fu station, Hong Kong (MTR station code)
 London & Overseas Freighters, a defunct UK merchant shipping company
 London Fields railway station, England (National Rail station code)
 Trans States Airlines (ICAO designator)
 Leftover Crack, a NYC crust punk band

In other uses:
 Lof, a Chilean ethnic group
 Löf, a municipality in Germany